Somatina subviridata is a moth of the  family Geometridae. It is found in Sierra Leone.

References

Moths described in 1901
Scopulini
Moths of Africa